Jacqueline Hernandez (born December 2, 1992) is an American snowboarder. Hernandez was injured at the 2014 Winter Olympics in Sochi, Russia.

References

External links 
 
 
 
 
 

1992 births
Living people
American female snowboarders
Olympic snowboarders of the United States
Snowboarders at the 2014 Winter Olympics
People from Windham County, Vermont
Sportspeople from Vermont
21st-century American women